Lake Quassapaug is a  reservoir located in Middlebury, Connecticut. It is home to Quassy Amusement Park.

References

Quassapaug
Quassapaug
Connecticut placenames of Native American origin